Fanatiz is an international over-the-top sports streaming service. It focuses on South American sport.

History

Matías Rivera founded Fanatiz in 2016 because expats from South America could only watch football from their home countries via illegal websites and in poor quality. He was eager to change this and founded Fanatiz which provides football from across South America to all countries without broadcasting rights and licenses. It started with the Argentine Football League (LPF) in September 2017.In October 2018 they grew to 40 thousand registered users and have grown 30% per month. In August 2020, Brazilian football leagues followed including both the national and state championships. Fanatiz is based on the nunchee software.

Rights
As of March 2023

Chile
As platform of the channel CDO+ of Canal del Deporte Olímpico.
Basketball
Liga Nacional de Básquetbol de Chile
Copa
Supercopa
Field Hockey
League
Handball
League

Football 

Argentine Primera División
Copa Argentina

Campeonato Brasileiro Série A
Campeonato Brasileiro Série B
State football leagues in Brazil (Selected Games)

Categoría Primera A

Peruvian Primera División

Handball

South and Central America Handball Confederation
Fanatiz has since 2021 the rights for all competitions from the South and Central America Handball Confederation.

National teams
Adult South and Central Championship
Men: 2022
Women: 2021, 2022
Central American Handball Championship
Men: 2021, 2023
Women: 2023
Junior South and Central Championship
Men: 2022
Women: 2022
Youth South and Central Championship
Men: 2022
Women: 2022
IHF Trophy (South and Central American)
Beach
Adult South and Central Championship: 2022
Junior South and Central Championship: 2022
Youth South and Central Championship: 2022
Clubs
Men: 2022
Women: 2022

Countries

League via CDO+

Championship

References

External links
Official website

Internet television channels
Sports television networks
Subscription video streaming services
Internet properties established in 2017
2017 establishments in the United States